Erskine is a town in the council area of Renfrewshire, and historic county of the same name, situated in the West Central Lowlands of Scotland. It lies on the southern bank of the River Clyde, providing the lowest crossing to the north bank of the river at the Erskine Bridge, connecting the town to Old Kilpatrick in West Dunbartonshire. Erskine is a commuter town at the western extent of the Greater Glasgow conurbation, bordering Bishopton to the west and  Renfrew, Inchinnan, Paisley and Glasgow Airport to the south. Originally a small village settlement, the town has expanded since the 1960s as the site of development as an overspill town, boosting the population to over 15,000. In 2014, it was rated one of the most attractive postcode areas to live in Scotland.

History

Archaeological evidence states that agricultural activity took place within the area as far back as 3000 BC and it has been inhabited by humans since 1000 BC. The first recorded mention of Erskine is at the confirmation of the church of Erskine in 1207 by Florentius, Bishop of Glasgow. The land around the town was first part of the estate of Henry de Erskine in the 13th century. Sir John Hamilton of Orbiston held the estate in the 17th century until 1703 when it was acquired by the Lords Blantyre. By 1782 there were twelve houses and a church in Erskine. A new church was then built which is still in use today. An influx of workmen moved to the area during 1836-41 due to the construction of the Inverclyde railway line. In 1900 it passed into the ownership of William Arthur Baird, who inherited it from his grandfather, Charles Stuart, 12th Lord Blantyre.

In the late 18th century, the town of Erskine was a hamlet. During this time, stone quays were constructed to support the Erskine Ferry to Old Kilpatrick and Dunbartonshire. This replaced the river ford which had been in place since medieval times. In light of increased industry and infrastructure in the surrounding area, it gradually became a village in the following century. The small church community grew to having 3,000 residents in 1961, when Renfrewshire County Council unveiled its "New Community" plan for the town's development which involved the Scottish Special Housing Association.

The development began in 1971 with the building of both privately owned and rented accommodation which boosted the town's population by around 10,000. Having established itself as a thriving commuter town, the 1990s saw the building of larger and more expensive housing, aimed at more affluent property buyers. Due to apprehension about further expansion of the town, several proposals for further large housing developments have been rejected. This is largely because the town has only one secondary school.

Geography
The town expanded in the 1970s with the construction of housing association stock. Since that decade, considerable private housing developments have continued. As more private houses were built in the 1980s, Erskine started to become an attractive place to live due to location factors and accessibility to main roads and the M8 Motorway. Due to this there was a major boom in property development in the 80s and 90s. Most ex-and existing housing association stock are found in the Bargarran, North Barr and Park Mains areas of the town. Private housing is mostly found in the west part of the town, e.g. Garnieland, Flures Drive, Hawthorn, Parkvale, Parkinch, St. Annes, West Freelands. Many house builders that have been attracted to the area include Miller Homes, Avonside, L & C, Beazer, Cala, Kier and Tay Homes.

The town borders a number of nearby settlements, some separated by a rural hinterland.

Economy

The town's Bridgewater complex provides a range of tertiary sector businesses, chiefly retail and leisure facilities. These include a Morrisons and Aldis supermarket, a tanning salon, a dental surgery, a Greggs bakery, a butcher, a fish & chip shop, a Subway store, a Domino's Pizza store, a pub with dining area, a Chinese restaurant, an optician, a chemist, a doctors surgery, hardware store, Ladbrokes bookmakers, a hair salon, an estate agency, a dry-cleaners and key cutting service, a swimming pool, a funeral directors, a bank and a public library. There are also smaller retail areas in the Bargarran, Mains Drive and Park Glade areas, where there are a few shops and restaurants as well as a community centre.

On the riverside, there is an office block which is home to a logistic company. There was a former call centre in the small business park until late 2019. The Erskine Bridge Hotel (formerly Esso Motor Hotel) is also situated on the banks of the Clyde. A few hundred yards up river is the Pandamonium Play Centre. There are 2 private golf clubs in Erskine. The Erskine Golf Club, which is located on the border between Erskine and Bishopton.

In addition to a number of local playing fields, the area has two recently constructed sporting facilities: the Erskine Community Sports Centre and the Astroturf at Park Mains High School.

Landmarks

Erskine Bridge
 
The Erskine Bridge towers high over the western limit of the town. The bridge is the furthest west crossing point on the river and it soon expands to become the Firth of Clyde estuary.

Erskine House

Erskine House was constructed between 1828 and 1845. It was designed by Sir Robert Smirke, the architect of the British Museum. During the First World War it became the Princess Louise Scottish Hospital for Limbless Sailors and Soldiers. It is now the 5-star Mar Hall Hotel, recalling the estate's former ownership by the Earl of Mar.

Erskine Hospital

The town is home to the Erskine Hospital, a facility that provides long-term care for veterans of the British Armed Forces and their Spouses, with a drop-in day centre and newly built Transitional Supported Accommodation for younger veterans at the Veterans Village near Bishopton. The charity opened as Princess Louise Scottish Hospital for Limbless Sailors and Soldiers in 1916 due to the urgent need to treat the thousands of military personnel that lost their limbs in the First World War. It has gone on to offer help to British ex-service people from all wars since World War One. It has grown to become one of the biggest ex-services facility in Scotland.

The charity has two units within the Erskine area and also specialist units in Glasgow and Edinburgh. The charity has strong links with the British Royal Family. Prince Charles is the charity's patron. He opened the flagship unit called Erskine Home in 2000. Princess Anne has also opened various units for the charity.

The charity host various fundraising events throughout the year. They host an annual motorbike meet, a Military themed ball, Christmas fayre and various concerts. The charity accept the help of volunteers from the public and needs to raise £10 million annually to run its services.

In February 2021, drug and alcohol addiction clinic Abbeycare Scotland relocated to the 34 bed unit in Meadows Drive no longer used by the Erskine charity.

Boden Boo

The  area is ideal for walking and cycling. The Erskine Beach is also situated here. Forestry and Land Scotland is responsible for the area.

Bodinbo Island
This is one of seven or more islands that once stood in River Clyde. Bodinbo Island was a hazard to navigation but was cut off from the main river by a training dike in the mid 19th century.

Rashielee Quay and quarries
Much of the whinstone used to build the retaining walls, jetties, quays, etc. in the lower Clyde area came from the Rashielee Quarries and was transported via Rashielee Quay. The area has now been landscaped however parts of the quarries are still present however the quay has been infilled.

Park or Fulton's Quay

Usually known as Park Quay this disused private quay and jetty stands close to the site of the old Park House estate. It was probably built in between 1789 and 1801 by the Fultons who made their fortune manufacturing silk in Paisley and one of the owners was W.T.Lithgow of the shipbuilding firm. The quay seems to have been last used in the mid 20th century.

Newshot Island
Erskine also boasts the unique natural habitat of Newshot Island Nature Reserve, a salt marsh which juts out into the River Clyde. Contrary to its name, it is now a peninsula, created from silt left over from the widening and deepening of the river in the 1930s, which connected the island to Erskine. The nature reserve acts as a feeding and resting point for a wide array of migratory birds traveling to and from regions such as North America, Siberia and West Africa.

Transport
Erskine is served by Glasgow Airport, which is located  4 km south of the town.

Old Greenock Road connects Erskine to the M8 motorway, the Erskine Bridge and Bishopton. The last tip at the northern side of the A726 also connects to the Erskine bridge. This road cuts through the centre of Erskine itself and is also the primary road for traveling into Paisley. Erskine is serviced by McGill's Bus Services. Buses operate to Glasgow, Paisley, Renfrew, Inchinnan, Clydebank, Glasgow Airport.

Education
The town's secondary school is called Park Mains High School. It is the largest school in Renfrewshire and one of the biggest in Scotland with up to 1,400 students. It is a non-denominational state school. For Roman Catholic denomination state education, the town falls within the catchment area of Trinity High School in nearby Renfrew. Erskine has five primary schools. All are state schools, with Rashielea, Bargarran and Barsail providing non-denominational education and St John Bosco and St Anne's providing Roman Catholic denomination education.

Notable residents

John McArthur, union general during the American Civil War
John Smeaton, apprehender of terrorists during the Glasgow Airport attacks
Marcus Campbell, snooker player
Stevie Jackson, guitarist for Belle & Sebastian
Blair Spittal, Partick Thistle Footballer
Rev Dr Andrew Stewart MD FRSE (1771-1838) minister of Erskine
Maurice Malpas, former Motherwell and Dundee United Football, also has caps for Scotland

See also

 Lamont Farm
 Blantyre Monument
 Bargarran Witches
 Donald's Quay - Original terminus of the Erskine Ferry
 St Patrick's Rock

References

External links

National Library of Scotland: Scottish Screen Archive (Selection of archive films about Erskine)

Towns in Renfrewshire
Greater Glasgow
Civil parishes of Scotland